Georg Thurmair (7 February 1909 – 20 January 1984) was a German poet who wrote around 300 hymns, a writer, journalist and author of documentary films.

Career
He became an assistant to  who had worked in Munich from 1923, but moved to Düsseldorf when he was elected president of the Katholischer Jungmännerverband Deutschlands. Thurmair studied at the Düsseldorf Abendgymnasium.

In 1932 Thurmair edited at a national meeting of the  several editions of the weekly Junge Front, which was directed against the emerging National Socialism. The Nazis claimed the title, and it had to be renamed Michael in 1935, and was banned in 1936. Thurmair worked on two songbooks of the Jungmännerverband,  and Das gelbe Singeschiff. From 1934, Thurmair was an editor of the youth journal Die Wacht, which first published in 1935 his hymns "Nun, Brüder, sind wir frohgemut" (known as the Altenberg pilgrimage song) and "Wir sind nur Gast auf Erden", which was first called a Reiselied (travel song).

He was interrogated by the Gestapo and included in a Liste der verdächtigen Personen (list of suspicious persons). He therefore wrote under various pseudonyms, such as Thomas Klausner, Stefan Stahl, Richard Waldmann, Simpel Krone, and Schikki. In 1936, Thurmair and Adolf Lohmann published a school songbook for the Rhineland. As it juxtaposed Catholic songs and Nazi songs, it was banned.

Called a Standard Songbook, this collection of 140 old and new songs, beginning with the 16th century and including several Protestant songs, as well as ten of Thurmair's songs, was significant for ecumenical church singing in German and became the germ cell for the Gotteslob of 1975, which incorporated 75 of the Kirchenlied songs. This hymnal was not immediately banned, because of its many Protestant songs.

When the Jugendhaus Düsseldorf was closed on 6 February 1939, Thurmair became a freelance writer in Recklinghausen and, a year later, in Munich. He was drafted from 1940 to 1945.

He married Maria Luise Thurmair in 1941, and they worked together. He worked mainly for the Christophorus-Verlag in Freiburg, which belongs to the Catholic Verlag Herder, and as chief editor of several Catholic papers. He died in Munich and was buried in the Munich Waldfriedhof.

Awards 
 Knight of the Order of St. Sylvester (1960)

Works 
 Das helle Segel (1935)
 Die ersten Gedichte an die Freunde (1938)
 Pfad der Wenigen (1949)
 Hausbuch zur Advents- und Weihnachtszeit (1959)
 Weg und Werk: Die Katholische Kirche in Deutschland (1960)
 Brüder überm Sternenzelt (um 1970)
 Gesicht der Hoffnung  (1988)

Hymns in Gotteslob 
Several of Thurmair's hymn were part of the Catholic hymnal Gotteslob of 1975, and are part of the 2013 Gotteslob, including (with the older GL number in brackets):
 551 (262) Nun singt ein neues Lied dem Herren (1969/1972, after Psalm 98)
 271 (169) O Herr, aus tiefer Klage (1935)
 334 (208) O Licht der wunderbaren Nacht (1963)
 377 (472), 2 O Jesu, all mein Leben bist du (1938)
 455 (615), 2+3 Alles meinem Gott zu Ehren (1963)
 489 (637) Laßt uns loben, Brüder, loben (1948), now: Lasst uns loben, freudig loben (2013)
 487 (638) Nun singe Lob, du Christenheit (1964)
 500 (660) Nun lässest du, o Herr (1966)
 505 (656)  (1935)

Some hymns appeared only in the first edition of 1975, or were included in regional sections of the later edition, including:

General
 167 O höre, Herr, erhöre mich (1963)
 260 Singet Lob unserm Gott (1940/1971), in Limburg 2013 GL 815
 517 Herr Jesus, öffne unsern Mund (1963)
 540 Sei gelobt, Herr Jesus Christ (1943)
 556 Völker aller Land (1964/1971), after Psalm 47, in Limburg 2013 GL 802
 565 Komm, Herr Jesus, komm zur Erde (1939)
 590–592 Maria sei gegrüßt (Rosary, 1940/1970)

Appendix in dioceses
 Nun, Brüder, sind wir frohgemut (1935)
 Wir bitten dich, Herr Jesu Christ
 Der Satan löscht die Lichter aus
 Mein Gott, wie schön ist deine Welt

Documentaries 
 Pro Mundi Vita (1961)
 Lux mundi (Licht der Welt) (1968)

Bibliography 
 
 Elisabeth Thurmair: Ein Gast auf Erden: Georg Thurmair. Mahner – Rufer – Rebell. Eggenfelden 1986

Notes

References

External links 
 
 
 Georg Thurmair 1909 – 1984 / Publications Carus-Verlag
 Georg Thurmair / Stücke (in German) Theaterverlag
 Dirk Ippen (ed.): Von guten Mächten wunderbar geborgen: die 100 schönsten geistlichen Lieder (in German) C. H. Beck 2005, p. 32–33

20th-century German poets
German male poets
German Roman Catholic hymnwriters
Writers from Munich
1909 births
1984 deaths
German newspaper editors
20th-century German male writers